The Liberal Catholic Church of Ontario (LCCO) was a non-theosophical Liberal Catholic denomination in Canada, now merged into the Christ Catholic Church International, which formed in 1991. The LCCO grew out of the Old Catholic Diocese of Hamilton in 1949 by William Henry Daw, who was appointed LCCO's first bishop in 1955.

See also

Community Catholic Church of Canada
Independent Anglican Church Canada Synod

References

External links 
The Liberal Catholic Apostolic Church history

Independent Catholic denominations
Christianity in Ontario
Christian organizations established in 1949
1949 establishments in Ontario